Anastrangalia scotodes is a species of beetle from family Cerambycidae. They live especially in Africa.

References

Lepturinae
Beetles described in 1873